‘Ala al-Din ‘Ali ibn ‘Abd-al-Malik Husam al-Din al-Muttaqi al-Hindi (1472 - 1567 CE/888 - 975 AH) was a Sunni Islamic scholar who is known for writing Kanz al-Ummal.

Biography
Al-Muttaqī was born in 1472 CE (888 AH) in Burhanpur, an Indian town in southern Madhya Pradesh on the banks of the Tapti River. ‘Alī al-Muttaqī writes in his autobiography that when he was eight years old, it occurred to his father to enroll him in the service of Shaykh Bajan. The Shaykh instructed him in samā‘ and Shaykh ‘Abd al-Raḥīm Bajan taught me adhkār [pl. of "dhikr"]. ‘Ali al-Muttaqī soon after earned his living as a scribe. He travelled to different regions of Hindustan and travelled to Multan to meet Ḥisām al-Dīn al-Muttaqī and stayed under his guardianship, where he was instructed in Taṣawwuf (Sufism). ‘Alī al-Muttaqī then travelled to Mecca and stayed in the company of Abu al-Ḥasan al-Bakrī al-Ṣiddīqī, from whom he acquired knowledge of hadith and Taṣawwuf. Ali Muttaqi was the follower of Sheikh Muse, he read his books in Hartmut, Yemen.‘Alī al-Muttaqī wrote some of his early works in Mecca. ‘Alī al-Muttaqī also studied with the hadith scholar Shihāb al-Dīn Aḥmad bin Hajar al-Makkī. ‘Alī al-Muttaqī returned twice to India to Gujarat, which was ruled by Maḥmūd Shāh, who was an admirer of the Shaykh.

Works
Regarding ‘Alī al-Muttaqī, the Ahl-i Hadith scholar Siddiq Hasan Khan of Bhopal says:
"I have read and studied the works of Shaykh ‘Alī al-Muttaqī, his works are very beneficial and informative and complete."

‘Alī al-Muttaqī's works include:
 Kanz al-‘Ummāl, this is his most famous work. This work is printed.
 Talkhīṣ al-Bayān, this book is regarding the Mahdi of the last time.
 Maṭla‘ al-Ghāyah, it is a summary of Ibn al-Athīr’s "Al-Nihāyah fī Gharīb al-Aḥādīth". A manuscript of this was available in the Berlin Library.
 Ghāyat al-Kamāl fī Bayān Afḍal al-‘Amaml, a copy of it is in the Dār al-‘Ulūm library of Peshawar , a copy also exists in Institute of Oriental Manuscripts Leningrad.
 Al-Fuṣūl fī Sharḥ Jami‘ al-Uṣūl, a hand written manuscript by ‘Alī al-Muttaqī is in the collections of Khuda Bakhsh Oriental Public Library
 Jawāmi‘ Kalim fī al-Mawāḍi‘ wa'l-Ḥikam, manuscripts of this work is available in many Indian collections also in Paris, Berlin, and al-Azhar.
 Al-Aḥādīth al-Mutawattira, a manuscript is available Raza Library Rampur, India.  
 Al-Rutba al-Fākhira, this deals with "taṣawwuf".
 Tabyīn al-Ṭarīq, also "taṣawwuf".
 Al-Ḥukm al-‘Irfānīya, also "taṣawwuf".
 Al-Burhān al-Jalī fī Ma‘rifat al-Walī.

Other books by ‘Alī al-Muttaqī are mentioned in the introduction of "Kanz al-‘Ummāl", a rare manuscript of his is available in the Chester Beatty Library in Dublin, Ireland.

Death
‘Alī al-Muttaqī died in Mecca (1567 CE/975 AH), where he was buried at the Jannat al-Mu'alla cemetery.

See also
Islamic scholars

References

External links
Ghadir . al-islam.org.

1567 deaths
Indian Sunni Muslim scholars of Islam
Year of birth unknown
1472 births
15th-century Indian scholars
15th-century Indian writers
Hadith compilers
Hadith scholars
Hadith studies
15th-century Indian non-fiction writers
15th-century Indian historians
15th-century Indian people
15th-century Indian philosophers
16th-century Indian Muslims
16th-century Indian historians
16th-century Indian non-fiction writers
16th-century Indian philosophers
16th-century Indian scholars
16th-century Indian writers
Indian historians of Islam
Indian Sunni Muslims
Burials at Jannat al-Mu'alla
Hanafis
Qadiri order
Sunni Sufis